Svend Jacobsen (19 August 1906 – 11 February 1986) was a Danish fencer. He competed in the individual and team foil and team sabre events at the 1936 Summer Olympics.

References

1906 births
1986 deaths
Danish male fencers
Olympic fencers of Denmark
Fencers at the 1936 Summer Olympics
Sportspeople from Copenhagen
People from Furesø Municipality